The Civic Movement (OH) was a liberal political party based in the Czech Republic, which existed from 1991 to 1995. The party was established after the break-up of Civic Forum by the liberal wing of Civic Forum, while the conservative wing established the Civic Democratic Party. Foreign Minister Jiří Dienstbier was elected leader of the Civic Movement. The party participated in the 1992 legislative election but failed to reach the required 5% threshold and was left without parliamentary representation. 

The party then renamed itself as the Free Democrats (Svobodní demokraté, SD), modelled on the Free Democratic Party of Germany, as the party tried to position itself as a more clearcut liberal party. The party joined the Liberal International and was admitted as an affiliate to the European Liberal Democrats and Reformists (ELDR) in 1994.

In December 1995 the Free Democrats merged with the Liberal National Social Party (successor to the former bloc party Czechoslovak Socialist Party) and formed the Free Democrats – Liberal National Social Party (SD-LSNS), which was again, however, unsuccessful in the 1996 legislative election. Some former members of OH established the Party for the Open Society in 1998.

Election results

Chamber of Deputies

References

 
Defunct political parties in the Czech Republic
Liberal parties in the Czech Republic
Defunct liberal political parties
Political parties in Czechoslovakia
Political parties established in 1991
Political parties disestablished in 1991
1991 establishments in Czechoslovakia
1996 disestablishments in the Czech Republic
Centrist political parties in the Czech Republic
Civic Forum breakaway groups